Hollow City may refer to:

 Hollow City (film), a 2004 Angolan film
 Hollow City (novel), a 2014 novel by Ransom Riggs
 The Hollow City, a location in the game The Elder Scrolls Online